Mount Antero  is the highest summit of the southern Sawatch Range of the Rocky Mountains of North America. The mountain is named in honor of Chief Antero of the Uintah band of the Ute people.

Mountain
Mount Antero is prized for its gemstone deposits and has one of the highest concentrations of aquamarine in the country.  There are several active private mining claims being exploited on Mount Antero and surrounding peaks.

The peak is located due south of the more visually prominent Mount Princeton.  Mount Antero is one of the most prominent peaks of the Sawatch Range, rising an impressive 7,200 feet above the town of Salida, Colorado to the southeast. There are two popular climbing routes on Mount Antero.  The generally accepted hiking route is from the east starting at the Browns Creek Trailhead and paralleling Little Browns Creek to its upper reaches where it crosses Forest Road 1A, then following the road near to the summit. The other route, which begins near the ghost town of St. Elmo, follows the same forest road from the north up Baldwin Creek.  This route has heavy mining and tourist traffic in fair weather during the summer months.

The peak was surveyed by the Pike Expedition in 1806.  A forest service sign at the Browns Creek trailhead commemorates the expedition camp at the eastern base of the peak.

On July 20, 2018, 5-time World mountain running Champion Joseph Gray ran the fastest known time (FKT) up Mount Antero from the bottom of FS road 277 to the top of Mount Antero in 1:23:10.

Historical names

Antero Peak
Mount Antero

See also

List of mountain peaks of Colorado
List of Colorado fourteeners

Notes

References

San Isabel National Forest Map, United States Department of Agriculture, Forest Service (2003)

External links
 Mount Antero at 14ers.com
 Mount Antero at Colorado Fourteeners Initiative
 Mount Antero at Distantpeak.com
 Mount Antero at ListsofJohn.com
 Mount Antero at Peakbagger.com
 Mount Antero at Peakery.com
 Mount Antero at USDA Forest Service
 Various Photos of Mt. Antero
 Video of Mount Antero

Mountains of Colorado
Mountains of Chaffee County, Colorado
San Isabel National Forest
Fourteeners of Colorado
North American 4000 m summits